Enallagma novaehispaniae, the neotropical bluet, is a species of narrow-winged damselfly in the family Coenagrionidae. It is found in Central America, North America, and South America.

The IUCN conservation status of Enallagma novaehispaniae is "least concern", with no immediate threat to the species' survival. The population is stable. The IUCN status was reviewed in 2017.

References

Further reading

 

Coenagrionidae
Odonata of South America
Odonata of North America
Taxa named by Philip Powell Calvert
Insects described in 1907
Articles created by Qbugbot